Jennifer Camila González Quintana (born 9 April 1999), known as Camila González, is a Paraguayan footballer who plays as a midfielder for Deportivo Capiatá and the Paraguay women's national team.

Club career
González is former player of Universidad Autónoma.

International career
González represented Paraguay at two FIFA U-17 Women's World Cup editions (2014 and 2016) and the 2018 FIFA U-20 Women's World Cup. She made her senior debut on 4 October 2019 in a 1–1 friendly draw against Venezuela.

References

1999 births
Living people
Women's association football midfielders
Paraguayan women's footballers
Paraguay women's international footballers
Deportivo Capiatá players
20th-century Paraguayan women
21st-century Paraguayan women